Peking Union Medical College Hospital (PUMCH), also known as Beijing Xiehe Hospital, is a large of teaching hospital in Beijing, China. It was founded in 1921 by Rockefeller Foundation and is affiliated to both Peking Union Medical College (PUMC) and Chinese Academy of Medical Sciences (CAMS). During the Cultural Revolution, it was renamed the "Anti-imperialist Hospital".

The last emperor of the Great Qing Dynasty, Aisin-Gioro Puyi, died at the Peking Union Medical College Hospital on October 17, 1967.

References

External links

 Official website of PUMCH

Hospitals in Beijing
Hospitals established in 1921
Rockefeller Foundation
1921 establishments in China
Dongcheng District, Beijing
Xicheng District